Woodhaven is a southern suburb of Durban, KwaZulu-Natal, South Africa. It lies just east of Yellowwood Park and borders Woodlands to its east.

References

Suburbs of Durban